The following is a List of Israeli flags.

National flag and state flag

Governmental flags

Military and police flags

Army flags

Navy flags

Air Force flags

Police flags

Knesset Guard flag

Intelligence flags

Prison Service

Municipal flags

Organization flags

Political flags

Historical flags

National flag proposals

Lifeguard flags

Minority flags

See also
 Emblem of Israel
 Flag of Israel

External links 
 

Flags
Lists and galleries of flags
National symbols of Israel